Mississippi Highway 305 (MS 305) is a north–south highway in Lafayette, DeSoto, and Tate counties. An unsigned segment runs from the north shore of Sardis Lake in Teckville to MS 310. The main segment runs from MS 4, just east of the community of Looxahoma, north through eastern DeSoto and Tate counties to its northern terminus at the Mississippi/Tennessee state line.

Route description
The southern segment of MS 305 is not signed nor maintained by the state; it is instead maintained by Lafayette County as County Route 517 (CR 517). The road begins in Teckville at a boat launch for Sardis Lake and heads northwest through a wooded area past many small houses. This segment ends at an intersection with MS 310 and CR 515 at a fire station and small market.

The signed portions of MS 305 begins as a two-lane highway at MS 4 east of the community of Looxahoma. From there, the route runs north through the community of Independence to the Desoto/Tate county line. From the Desoto/Tate county line, the route continues north through the community of Cockrum and crosses the Coldwater River before passing through the communities of Lewisburg and Cedarview. In the Lewisburg area, MS 305 intersects with Interstate 269 at a diamond interchange. MS 305 continues into Olive Branch and widens to five lanes just before the intersection with Church Road. MS 305 then passes through a grade-separated interchange with U.S. Route 78 (US 78). As it approaches downtown Olive Branch, the route is signed as Cockrum Road. 

After an interchange with MS 302, the route is signed as Germantown Road. MS 305 terminates at State Line Road, but continues into Shelby County, Tennessee as Riverdale Road.

Major intersections

See also

References

External links

305
Transportation in DeSoto County, Mississippi
Transportation in Lafayette County, Mississippi
Transportation in Tate County, Mississippi